Laudaricus (died 451) was a prominent Hunnic chieftain and general active in the first half of the 5th century.

Biography
The Chronica Gallica of 511 under the year 451 noted him as Attila's blood relative, who died at the Battle of the Catalaunian Plains in 451 AD. He was the Huns' highest ranking casualty at this battle. The outcome of the battle is uncertain, but Kim, pointing out that the death of a commanding general in battle often meant defeat at the time, suggests that the death of the Visigoth king Theodoric in this clash very likely meant the end of the battle for the Visigoths. Because the Huns managed to eliminate the king of their rivals and, most importantly, they had possession of the battlefield after the end of the battle, the outcome was likely a Hun victory.

The only relic found at the site of the battle (Châlons) was a Hunnish cauldron. Kim suggests this was likely used for the burial of Laudaricus, the Huns' most prestigious casualty.

Etymology
M. Schönfeld considered the name to be of Germanic origin, *Lauda reiks (possibly "famous king"; compare Ludwig). Omeljan Pritsak proposed possible Gothicization and correction of the name by the chronicler from Turkic *Valda > Velda (< *Belda > Bleda). Otto J. Maenchen-Helfen thought the name was Germanic, *Laudareiks.

References

Sources
 
 

451 deaths
Germanic warriors
Hunnic rulers
Year of birth unknown
Attila the Hun
People killed in action